The Lambs, Inc. (also known as The Lambs Club) is a social club in New York City for actors, songwriters, and others involved in the theatre.  It is America's oldest theatrical organization. "The Lambs" is a registered trademark of The Lambs, Inc.; and the club has been commonly referred to as The Lambs Club and The Lambs Theater since 1874.

The club's name honors the essayist Charles Lamb and his sister Mary, who during the early 19th century played host to actors and literati at their famed salon in London.

History
In the spring of 1869, The Lambs was founded in London by actors led by John Hare, the first Shepherd, looking to socialize with like-minded people. Several of those, most notably Henry James Montague, came to the United States and formed The Lambs of New York during Christmas week of 1874. It was incorporated in 1877 in New York City. Shortly afterward the London Lambs closed.

The Actors' strike of 1919 was settled in The Lambs, which was referred to as "Local One." In 1924 they celebrated their golden jubilee at the Earl Carroll Theatre.

Historically, The Lambs has been the spawning ground of plays, friendships and partnerships. Mark Twain Tonight (with Hal Holbrook) and Stalag 17 were first performed at The Lambs prior to their national successes.

Alan J. Lerner and Frederick Loewe first met at The Lambs, often trying works-in-progress on their fellow Lambs. Loewe left a percentage of his share of Brigadoon royalties to The Lambs' Foundation. 

The Lambs, the New York Friars' Club, and The Players in New York are often confused. In 1964 long-time syndicated columnist Earl Wilson put it this way: "Long ago a New Yorker asked the difference between the Lambs, Friars, and Players, since the membership was, at the time, predominantly from Broadway." It was left to "a wit believed to have been George S. Kaufman" to draw the distinction: "The Players are gentlemen trying to be actors, the Lambs are actors trying to be gentlemen, and the Friars are neither trying to be both."

Notable Lambs

Since its founding, there have been more than 6,700 Lambs, including: 
Fred Astaire, 
Irving Berlin, 
Sid Caesar,
James Cagney, 
Eddie Cantor, 
George M. Cohan, 
Cecil B. DeMille, 
W.C. Fields, 
Albert Hague, 
Ken Howard,
Al Jolson,
John F. Madden, 
Conrad Nagel, 
Eugene O’Neill, 
Donald Pippin, 
Cliff Robertson, 
Edward G. Robinson, 
Will Rogers, 
John Philip Sousa, 
Spencer Tracy,
Abe Vigoda,
Fred Waring, and
Jack Whiting.

Current members include: 
Matthew Broderick,
Jim Dale, and
Joyce Randolph of The Honeymooners.

The Lambs' website contains a listing of its past and current members.

Presidents
The president of The Lambs is called "The Shepherd". The Club displays the portraits of all its presidents, painted by artists such as James Montgomery Flagg and Everett Raymond Kinstler.

 Henry James Montague (1874–1878) 
 John Lester Wallack (1878–1879, 1880–1882, 1884–1888)
 Harry Beckett (actor) (1879–1880) 
 William Jermyn Conlin (1882–1884)
 John Riker Brady (1888–1890)
 Edmund Milton Holland (1890–1891)
 Clay Meredith Greene (1891–1898, 1902–1906)
 Thomas Benedict Clarke (1898–1900)
 DeWolf Hopper (1900–1902)
 Wilton Lackaye (1906–1907)
 Augustus Thomas (1907–1910)
 Joseph Rhode Grismer (1911–1913, 1917–1918)
 William Courtleigh (1913–1917)
 Robert Hubber Thorne Burnside (1918–1921)
 Albert Oldfield Brown (1921–1924, 1930–1932)
 Thomas Meighan (1924–1926)
 Thomas Alfred Wise (1926–1928)
 Fritz Williams (1928–1930)
 Frank Crumit (1932–1936)
 Fred Waring (1939–1942)
 John Lionel Golden (1942–1945)
 Raymond Wilson Peck (1945–1947)
 Bert Lytell (1947–1952)
 Walter Noel Greaza (1953–1956)
 William Gaxton (1936–1939, 1952–1953, 1957–1959, 1960–1961)
 Frank Marion Thomas (1962–1963)
 Martin Begley (1964–1965)
 Harry Hershfield (1966–1969)
 Jack Waldron (1969)
 Tom Dillon (actor) (1969–1986) Tom Dillon Bio  
 Richard L. Charles (1986–1997)
 Agustin James Pocock (1998–2001)
 Bruce Brown (2002–2008)
 Randy Phillips (2008–2013)
 Marc Baron (2013–2022)
 Kevin C. Fitzpatrick (2023-)

Clubhouses
 1874: Founded and first dinner at Delmonico's Restaurant (NE Corner of 5th Ave & 14th St.)
 1875: Morton House (Manhattan) (Union Square)
 1875: Union Square Hotel
 1876: Wallack's Theater 848 Broadway (nicknamed "The Matchbox")
 1877–78: 6 Union Square
 1878: 19 East 16th Street
 1880–1892: 34 West 26th St
 1891: Gilsey House, 1200 Broadway
 1892: 8 West 29th St
 1893–1896: 26 West 31st St
 1897–1905: 70 West 36th St (formerly and thereafter known as Keens Chophouse)
 1905–1975: 130 West 44th Street (expanded in 1907)
 1975: Guest in Lotos Club, 5 East 66th St
 1976: Current: 3 West Club, 3 West 51st Street, 5th Floor

128 West 44th Street
The Lambs has had many Manhattan homes since 1874, beginning with Delmonico's Restaurant in Union Square. Then in 1875 they met at the Maison Doree on the south side of 14th St. opposite Union Square; 1876–77 next to Wallack's theater at 848 Broadway; 1877–78 at the Union Square Hotel, 6 Union Square; 1879 within a brownstone at 19 East 16th St.; 1880–91 at a Brownstone at 34 West 26th St.; 1891 at the Gilsey House, 1200 Broadway; 1892 at 8 West 29th St.; 1893–96 at 26 West 31st St.; 1897–1905 at 70 West 36th St., what was formerly and thereafter Keen's Chophouse remodeled by Stanford White to be a clubhouse.

In 1905, the club moved to 128–130 West 44th Street, designed by Stanford White and doubled in size in 1915. The club remained at 44th Street until 1975, when it sold the structure to the Church of the Nazarene, which leased part of the building for what would become the Off Broadway Lamb's Theatre. The building was designated a New York City Landmark in September 1974 and was added to the National Register of Historic Places on June 3, 1982. The church sold the building in 2006 to Hampshire Hotels, which renovated the building into the Chatwal New York hotel. The Chatwal Hotel contains the Lambs Club restaurant although there is no relation between the hotel and The Lambs other than what was left of the building.

Current activity
The Lambs, Inc., is still active in its nine-story quarters at 3 West 51st St. adjacent to Rockefeller Center. Its members have been instrumental in the formation of ASCAP, Actors' Equity and The Actors' Fund of America, Screen Actors Guild (SAG) and in the merger that created SAG-AFTRA. Of the first 21 Council members of Actors' Equity, 20 were members of The Lambs. The meetings to form Actors' Equity were held at The Players, a club similar to The Lambs, because there were too many producer members of The Lambs.

References

Citations

Sources

Books

 
 
 

Newspapers

 
 
 
 

 Websites

External links

 The Lambs, Inc. website
 "The Lambs Club" – the NYC Chapter of the American Guild of Organists.
 Lambs Club records, 1880–1973, held by the Billy Rose Theatre Division, New York Public Library for the Performing Arts

 
1874 establishments in New York (state)
Arts organizations established in 1874
Theatrical organizations in the United States